Pimelea spicata, commonly known as the spiked rice flower, is a flowering plant in the family Thymelaeaceae and is endemic to New South Wales. It is a slender plant with white flowers and elliptic leaves.

Description

Taxonomy and naming
Pimelea spicata was first formally described in 1810 by Robert Brown and the description was published in Prodromus Florae Novae Hollandiae. The specific epithet (spicata) means "spicate".

Distribution and habitat
This pimelea grows in grassland on shale soils in coastal locations from Landsdowne to Shellharbour and inland to Penrith.Extends along the coast from Lansdowne south to Shellharbour and inland to Penrith, New South Wales.

Invasive weeds which compete with the plant for resources include bridal creeper (Asparagus asparagoides), bitou bush (Chrysanthemoides monilifera), blackberry (Rubus fruticosus agg.), St John's wort (Hypericum perforatum), kikuyu (Pennisetum clandestinum), lantana (Lantana camara), African olive (Olea africana subsp. africana) and privet (Ligustrum lucidum).

References 

Malvales of Australia
spicata
Endangered flora of Australia
Flora of New South Wales